Howard Dayton (born October 7, 1943, in Albany, Georgia), was raised in Daytona Beach, Florida. After graduating from the School of Hotel Administration at Cornell University in 1967, he served two and a half years as a naval officer. In 1969, Howard developed The Caboose, a railroad-themed restaurant, in Orlando. In 1972, he began his commercial real estate development career, specializing in office development in central Florida.

In 1970, Dayton began to meet with a group of businessmen, who introduced him to Jesus Christ as his savior. Three years later his business partner challenged him to study the Scriptures to discover what God teaches about handling money. They discovered that the Bible contained 2,350 verses dealing with money and possessions, and Dayton's life profoundly changed. God gave him a passion to share the principles he discovered, leading him to write eight books and six small-group studies, which have been translated into dozens of languages.

Dayton founded Crown Ministries in 1985 and developed a small-group financial study. Dayton served, without salary, as CEO of Crown. Crown Ministries merged with Larry Burkett's Christian Financial Concepts in September 2000 to form Crown Financial Ministries, the world's largest financial ministry at that time. During Dayton's tenure as CEO, the ministry taught Bible-based principles of handling money and operating a business to more than 50 million people in 88 countries. Dayton was named among the Top 20 CEOs of Christian Organizations, and the ministry was recognized as one of the “Best Christian Workplaces”.

Dayton served unsalaried as Crown's CEO until 2007, when he transitioned from that role. In 2008, he received an honorary doctorate from Asbury University.

In 2009, Dayton founded a new ministry, Compass - finances God's way, serving as the CEO in a full-time volunteer capacity. The vision of Compass is to teach people worldwide how to handle money and operate businesses God's way.

On March 28, 2014, Asbury University dedicated the Dayton School of Business.

Dayton has two adult children and four grandchildren and resides in Orlando, Florida.

Radio 
Upon Larry Burkett's death in 2003, Dayton followed Burkett as the host of Money Matters, a 20-year radio program with co-host Steve Moore, featuring call-in questions from listeners. The broadcast peaked in 2007, carried on 2,000 stations and outlets, with a weekly audience of about 2 million.

In 2011, Dayton joined Steve Moore again to start a new nationally syndicated call-in radio program, MoneyWise. It aired on 850 Christian radio stations and outlets, with an estimated weekly listening audience of 875,000. Howard selected Rob West as his successor host in 2017, and the broadcast was acquired by Kingdom Advisors, where West serves as president.

Dayton also hosted HeyHoward, a one-minute feature carried on approximately 1,100 stations and outlets.

Global Compass 
Compass has regional directors in North America, South America, Europe, Asia-Pacific, Africa, and India, and had expanded into 80 countries as of 2018.

Publications 
Books
Your Money: Frustration or Freedom (Tyndale House Publishers)
Your Money Counts (Tyndale House Publishers)
Free and Clear (Moody Publishers)
Your Money Map (Moody Publishers)
Money and Marriage God's Way (Moody Publishers)
Business God's Way (Compass)
ABCs of Handling Money God’s Way (Moody Publishers—for children ages 4–7) co-authored with Beverly Dayton
The Secret (Moody Publishers—for children 8-12) co-authored with Beverly Dayton

Audio Books
Your Money Counts (Compass – read by author)
Business God's way (Compass – read by author)
Money and Marriage God's Way (Oasis Audio – read by author)
Your Money Map (Oasis Audio – read by author)

Bibles
Financial Stewardship Bible (in collaboration with American Bible Society)

Studies
Navigating Your Finances God’s Way – small-group study
Money and Marriage God’s Way – small-group study
Business God’s Way – small-group study
Set Your House in Order – small-group study
Charting Your Legacy – small-group study (for "those entrusted with much")
Give, Save & Spend – for-credit college course developed in collaboration with Dan Lewis and Kyle Hasbrouck

DVD Series
Navigating Your Finances God's Way
Business God's Way

References

External links
Compass - Finances God's Way
Moody Publishers

1943 births
Living people
American chief executives
Cornell University School of Hotel Administration alumni